Maharshi Vashishtha Autonomous State Medical College, Basti (MVASMC, Basti) is a government autonomous state medical college in Basti, Uttar Pradesh, India.

In 2019, the college received approval for admission to the MBBS course.

About 

The college imparts the degree of Bachelor of Medicine and Surgery (MBBS). The college is affiliated with King George's Medical University and is recognized by the National Medical Commission. Selection to the college is made based on merit through the National Eligibility and Entrance Test. This college is also known as Maharshi Vashishtha Autonomous State Medical College, Basti (MVASMC Basti). The undergraduate student intake was 100 students in 2019.

Location 
NH 28 also passes through Basti. 

Basti is situated between Ayodhya and Gorakhpur.

Maharshi Vashishtha Autonomous State Medical College (MVASMC, Basti) is situated in Rampur, Basti, UP.

Courses 
This college offers degree of Bachelor of Medicine and Surgery (MBBS). Nursing and para-medical courses are also offered.

And started DNB Courses in following: Radiology, Anesthesia, Pediatrics & OB/GYN (obstetrics and gynecologist)

DNB is a post-graduate master's degree for Specialist Doctors. DNB is equivalent to MD/MS.

Departments

Pre and para clinical departments 
 Anatomy
 Physiology
 Biochemistry
 FMT
 Microbiology
 Pharmacology
 Community Medicine
 Pathology

Specialties 
 Anesthesiology
 Blood Bank
 Dentistry
 Dermatology, Venereology & Leprosy
 General Medicine
 General Surgery
 Orthopedics
 Oto-Rhino- Laryngology
 Ophthalmology
 Obstetrics & Gynaecology
 Pediatrics
 Psychiatry
 Radio- Diagnosis
Tuberculosis & Respiratory Diseases
Source:

Campus 

MVASMC Basti is spread over 17 acres of land.

Hospitals 

MVASMC, Basti is associated with OPEC Hospital, Kaili - its teaching hospital. It is a fully functional 500 bedded hospital having central laboratory services, CT scan, X-ray, ICU, ICCU, PICU, OTs, 24 hours Emergency services and full strength of specialist staff is available in the hospital. Also a new Oxygen Plant is installed in OPEC Hospital. And a new Trauma Center is fully constructed in OPEC Hospital Kaili. OPEC Hospital is upgraded as per norms of medical college. This hospital is now the integral part of medical college.

OPEC Hospital is spread over 34 acres of land. This hospital has heavy patients load of Basti City & District. 

Students also go in District Hospital Basti, VRTK District Woman Hospital, T.B. Hospital Basti for more clinical exposure.

References 

Medical colleges in Uttar Pradesh
Basti, Uttar Pradesh
2019 establishments in Uttar Pradesh
Educational institutions established in 2019